Florence Guérin (born 12 June 1965) is a French actress. She appeared in film and in television roles between 1983 and 1990.

Selected filmography
1983: Black Venus as Louise
1986: La Bonne as Anna
1987: D'Annunzio as Clo Albrini
1987: Montecarlo Gran Casinò as Sylvia
1987: Faceless as herself
1988: Too Beautiful to Die as Melanie Roberts
1989: Il gatto nero as Anne Ravenna

References 

1965 births
French film actresses
Living people
People from Nice
French television actresses
20th-century French actresses
21st-century French actresses